The Bayer designation Lambda Fornacis (λ For / λ Fornacis) is shared by two faint naked-eye stars about a degree apart, in the constellation Fornax:

λ1 Fornacis, HR 744
λ2 Fornacis, HR 772

Fornacis, Lambda
Fornax (constellation)